Raut may refer to:

Places
, a mountain in the Italian Alps
Raut, old name of Ronchi Valsugana, a town in Italy
Răut, river in Moldova

Social groups
 Raut (caste)
 Raute people, of Nepal
 A Rawat title used by the Rajdhoves caste in Nepal

People with the surname
 Abhishek Raut (born 1987), Indian cricketer
 Astha Raut, Nepali singer 
 , Indian politician elected in the 2008 Indian Rajya Sabha elections
 C. K. Raut, Nepal-born US-based computer scientist, author and film-director
 Chandrakant Raut (born 1945), Indian cricketer
 Harish Raut (1925–2002), Indian artist
 Kavita Raut (born 1985), Indian long-distance runner from Maharashtra
 Nitin Raut, Indian politician from Maharashtra belonging to the Indian National Congress party
 Poonam Raut (born 1989), Indian cricketer
 Sachidananda Raut Ray (1916–2004), Indian Oriya-language poet
 Sanjay Raut (born 1961), Indian politician from Maharashtra, belonging to the Shiv Sena party
 Shrikrishna Raut, Indian Marathi-language poet
 Ujjwala Raut (born 1978), Indian model
  Lopamudra Raut

Other uses
 , a Sumatran (Batak) knife; see 
 Raut Nacha, an Indian dance

See also
 Rout (surname)
 Rawat (disambiguation)